Juan Francisco Tinaglini Olariaga (born 9 November 1998) is a Uruguayan professional footballer who plays as a goalkeeper for Montevideo City Torque.

References

External links
Profile at SofaScore

1998 births
Living people
Uruguayan people of Italian descent
Uruguayan footballers
Uruguay youth international footballers
Association football goalkeepers
Club Atlético River Plate (Montevideo) players
Oriental players
Montevideo City Torque players
Atenas de San Carlos players
Uruguayan Primera División players
Uruguayan Segunda División players